City of Missing Girls is a 1941 American film directed by Elmer Clifton.

Plot
The police led by Captain McVeigh and the Assistant District Attorney James J. Horton are baffled by the disappearances of several young girls with some being found dead. Intrepid female newspaper reporter Nora Page's investigations reveal a link between the girls and the Crescent School of Fine Arts owned by gangster King Peterson, who is using the school as a front for a recruiting center for his nightclub "entertainers".  Things become more complex when Nora's father is connected with Peterson and her boyfriend James Horton is photographed in embarrassing circumstances with a woman found murdered after the photo was taken.

Cast 
H. B. Warner as Police Capt. "Mac" McVeigh
Astrid Allwyn as Nora Page
John Archer as Assistant D.A. James J. Horton
Sarah Padden as Mrs. Randolph
Philip Van Zandt as King Peterson
George Rosener as Police Officer 'Copper' Dugan
Kathryn Crawford as Helen Whitney
Patricia Knox as Kate Nelson
Walter Long as Police Officer Larkin
Gale Storm as Mary Phillips
Boyd Irwin as Joseph 'Joe' Thompson
Danny Webb as William 'Bill' Short, Photographer
Herb Vigran as Danny Mason

Critical reception
TV Guide called it "An awkward murder mystery."

References

External links 

1941 films
American mystery films
1940s English-language films
Films directed by Elmer Clifton
Films shot in Los Angeles
American black-and-white films
1941 crime drama films
American crime drama films
1940s American films